Roland Courteau (born 24 February 1943) is a member of the Senate of France, representing the department of Aude.  He is a member of the Socialist Party.

In the Senate, he sits on the Commission for Economic Affairs, and he is a member of the Delegation on the rights of women, and equality of opportunity between men and women.

Before entering the Senate in 1980, he worked as a teacher, and served as a Councillor, and Vice President on the General council of Aude.

References

Page on the Senate website

1943 births
Living people
Socialist Party (France) politicians
French Senators of the Fifth Republic
Senators of Aude
People from Narbonne
Politicians from Occitania (administrative region)